Ciro Díaz is composer, lead guitarist of the band Porno para Ricardo, and leader of the alternative rock band La Babosa Azul. Ciro earned a Bachelor in Mathematics from the University of Havana and learned to play the guitar on his own.

References

External links
  La Babosa Azul

Cuban guitarists
Cuban male guitarists
Living people
Year of birth missing (living people)